Whatever with Alexis and Jennifer was a two-hour daily radio talk show that aired on SiriusXM's Martha Stewart Living Radio channel.  The show's lifestyle talk format was marked by the different personalities of the two hosts, Alexis Stewart (daughter of Martha Stewart) and Jennifer Hutt (a.k.a. Jennifer Koppelman Hutt, daughter of Charles Koppelman). Individual episodes focused on various topics such as Stewart's romantic life or Hutt's family. Whatever premiered on Martha Stewart Living Radio on October 24, 2005, at noon Eastern Standard Time  as a launch program with the rest of the network. It was later moved from its original midday time-slot to 5 pm ET in 2006 because of show's sexually charged subject matter. A repeat was aired 7 days a week at 11 pm ET on channel 112.

Whatever differs from the other programming offered on Martha Stewart Living Radio as it follows a generally more freeflowing format and offers advice outside the traditional content areas usually seen in various Martha Stewart-branded ventures, such as cooking and homecare. In addition, the program is being targeted a younger demographic than Martha Stewart Living Omnimedia's core audience, similar to the way the company has promoted its new women's lifestyle magazine Blueprint.

On September 13, 2010, Whatever with Alexis and Jennifer became an hour-long television program on Hallmark Channel's Home block, using a similar concept, featuring guests such as Rosie O'Donnell and Paula Abdul in the first episodes.  It was announced on November 12 that the show would be pulled after that day's airing.

After the cancellation of the Whatever, Hallmark Channel aired the first few episodes of "Whatever, Martha!" season three. Season Three was taped during the summer of 2010 and aired April/May 2011. Along with Whatever, Martha was a half-hour debate with the girls entitled "Whatever, You're Wrong." Hallmark "found the shows too racy for its network" and pulled the shows from its late night lineup. 

It was announced early June 2011 that Alexis Stewart would be leaving the Whatever program and her final radio broadcast would be June 10, 2011. At present, the official website has also been shut down. A new show is active and hosted by Jennifer Koppelman Hutt.

External links
 Official website

Whatever with Alexis and Jennifer
Martha Stewart Living Omnimedia